Sant Antoni is a station on line 2 of the Barcelona Metro, opened in 1995. It is located in the Sants-Montjuïc district, under the Ronda de Sant Antoni.

The station has tracks on either side of an island platform, with a ticket hall at either end of the station. There are a total of three entrances: two to the south, on c/ Sant Antoni Abat and c/Comte d'Urgell, and one to the north, at c/ Villaroel. The station is wheelchair-accessible.

Services

References

External links

Sant Antoni - Trenscat.cat

Railway stations in Spain opened in 1995
Barcelona Metro line 2 stations